Two Jamaican Pieces is a short suite composed in 1938 by Arthur Benjamin which uses melodies from the West Indies.

It is in two sections, Jamaican Song and Jamaican Rumba.  The latter has become Benjamin's most popular work.  The suite was initially written for the duo-pianists Joan Trimble and her sister Valerie Trimble (Joan was Benjamin's student). Benjamin also arranged it for orchestra.

Larry Adler recorded a version in 1959 on Pye Records.

References
David Ewen, Encyclopedia of Concert Music.  New York; Hill and Wang, 1959.

1938 compositions
Compositions by Arthur Benjamin
Compositions for symphony orchestra
Compositions for two pianos